Odness is a peninsula and headland on the island of Stronsay, in Orkney, Scotland. The Odness peninsula contains the farm of Odiness. Odness is also within the parish of Stronsay.

References

External links

Canmore - Rose III Steam Drifter site record, Odness
Canmore - God Odina Settlement site record, Odness
Canmore - Burnt Mound site record, Odiness

Villages in Orkney
Stronsay